Mark Horowitz is an American television producer and director. He has produced and directed for JAG, NCIS, and Doogie Howser, M.D.

References

External links

American television directors
Living people
Year of birth missing (living people)
Place of birth missing (living people)